Polymera is a genus of crane fly in the family Limoniidae.

Species
Subgenus Polymera Wiedemann, 1820
P. aitkeni Alexander, 1978
P. albiditarsis Alexander, 1953
P. albitarsis Williston, 1896
P. albogeniculata Alexander, 1926
P. albogenualis Alexander, 1939
P. anticalba Alexander, 1939
P. arawak Alexander, 1964
P. brachyneura Alexander, 1962
P. bruchi Alexander, 1926
P. cavernicola Alexander, 1964
P. chiriquiensis Alexander, 1941
P. cinereipennis Alexander, 1926
P. cingulata Alexander, 1969
P. clausa Alexander, 1939
P. crystalloptera Alexander, 1921
P. furiosa Alexander, 1950
P. fusca Wiedemann, 1828
P. fuscitarsis Alexander, 1937
P. geniculata Alexander, 1915
P. georgiae Alexander, 1911
P. grisea Alexander, 1913
P. hirticornis (Fabricius, 1805)
P. honesta Alexander, 1940
P. inornata Alexander, 1913
P. leucopeza Alexander, 1940
P. melanosterna Alexander, 1945
P. microstictula Alexander, 1930
P. minutior Alexander, 1942
P. monosticta Alexander, 1948
P. neoclausa Alexander, 1967
P. nimbipennis Alexander, 1946
P. niveipes Alexander, 1979
P. niveitarsis Alexander, 1913
P. nodulifera Alexander, 1940
P. obscura Macquart, 1838
P. ominosa Alexander, 1938
P. parvicornis Alexander, 1932
P. pleuralis Alexander, 1913
P. prolixicornis Alexander, 1927
P. pulchricornis Alexander, 1914
P. regina Alexander, 1926
P. rogersiana Alexander, 1929
P. scelerosa Alexander, 1948
P. sordidipes Alexander, 1938
P. stenoptera Alexander, 1949
P. subsuperba Alexander, 1926
P. superba Alexander, 1913
P. thoracica Alexander, 1913
P. tibialis Alexander, 1922
P. unipunctata Alexander, 1921
P. verticillata Alexander, 1948
P. zeylanica Alexander, 1958
Subgenus Polymerodes Alexander, 1920
P. catharinae Alexander, 1931
P. conjuncta Alexander, 1913
P. conjunctoides Alexander, 1920
P. evanescens Alexander, 1948
P. leucostropha Alexander, 1966
P. minutissima Alexander, 1945
P. parishi Alexander, 1920
P. tasioceroides Alexander, 1948

References

Limoniidae